Raymond Lovell (13 April 1900 – 1 October 1953) was a Canadian-born actor who performed in British films. He mainly played supporting roles, often somewhat pompous characters.

Lovell initially trained as a physician at Cambridge University, but gave up medicine for the stage in the 1920s. On stage he appeared as Henry VIII in The Queen Who Kept Her Head. In 1941 he starred in Vernon Sylvaine's Warn That Man!, then reprised his role for the 1943 film adaptation.

Lovell married Margot Ruddock, an actress, singer and poet, with whom he had a daughter, Simone Lovell. This relationship broke down when Ruddock began an affair with W. B. Yeats in 1934, the year her daughter was born. In 1947 he married Tamara Desni; they divorced in 1951.

Selected filmography

 Love, Life and Laughter (1934) – Saville (uncredited)
 Warn London (1934) – Prefect
 The Third Clue (1934) – Robinson – Butler
 The Case of Gabriel Perry (1935) – Defence
 Crime Unlimited (1935) – Delaney
 Sexton Blake and the Mademoiselle (1935) – Captain
 Someday (1935) – Carr
 King of the Damned (1935) – Captain Torres
 Troubled Waters (1936) – Carter
 Gaol Break (1936) – Duke
 Not So Dusty (1936) – Mr. Holding
 Fair Exchange (1936) – Sir Reeves Willoughby
 Gypsy Melody (1936) – Court Chamberlain
 Secret Lives (1937) – German Secret Service Chief
 Behind Your Back (1937) – Adam Adams
 Glamorous Night (1937) – Ship's Officer (uncredited)
 Midnight Menace (1937) – Harris
 Under Secret Orders (1937) – Col. von Steinberg
 Murder Tomorrow (1938) – Inspector Travers
 Q Planes (1939) – Northern Salvage Company Manager (uncredited)
 Contraband (1940) – Van Dyne
 He Found a Star (1941) – Nick Maurier
 49th Parallel (1941) – Lieutenant Kuhnecke
 The Common Touch (1941) – Cartwright
 The Goose Steps Out (1942) – Schmidt
 Let the People Sing (1942) – Bit Role (uncredited)
 Alibi (1942) – Prof. Winkler
 Uncensored (1942) – von Koerner
 The Young Mr. Pitt (1942) – George the Third
 Warn That Man (1943) – Hausemann / Lord Buckley
 The Man in Grey (1943) – The Prince Regent
 Candlelight in Algeria (1944) – Von Alven
 Hotel Reserve (1944) – Robert Duclos
 The Way Ahead (1944) – Mr. Jackson – Garage Owner
 Caesar and Cleopatra (1945) – Lucius Septimius
 Night Boat to Dublin (1946) – Paul Faber
 Appointment with Crime (1946) – Gus Loman
 The End of the River (1947) – Porpino
 Easy Money (1948) – Mr. Cyprus
 Who Killed Van Loon? (1948) – John Smith / Johann Schmidt
 The Three Weird Sisters (1948) – Owen Morgan-Vaughan
 So Evil My Love (1948) – Edgar Bellamy
 Snowbound (1948) – Undetermined Role (uncredited)
 The Calendar (1948) – Lord Willie Panniford
 My Brother's Keeper (1948) – Bill Wainwright
 The Blind Goddess (1948) – Frank Mainwaring KC
 Quartet (1948) – Sir Frederick Bland (segment "The Alien Corn")
 But Not in Vain (1948) – Jan Alting
 Once Upon a Dream (1949) – Mr. Trout
 The Bad Lord Byron (1949) – John Hobhouse
 Fools Rush In (1949) – Sir Charles Leigh
 Madness of the Heart (1949) – Comte de Vandiere
 The Romantic Age (1949) – Hedges
 The Mudlark (1950) – Sergeant Footman Naseby
 Time Gentlemen, Please! (1952) – Sir Digby Montague
 The Pickwick Papers (1952) – Aide
 The Steel Key (1953) – Inspector Forsythe
 I vinti (1953) – (final film role)

Selected stage roles
 The Queen Who Kept Her Head by Winifred Carter (1934)
 A Lady Mislaid by Kenneth Horne (1950)
 Party Manners by Val Gielgud (1950)

References

External links

1900 births
1953 deaths
Anglophone Quebec people
Canadian male film actors
Male actors from Montreal
20th-century Canadian male actors
Canadian emigrants to the United Kingdom